Anarchism: From Theory to Practice is a book by Daniel Guérin noted as a "definitional tract in the 'ABCs' of anarchism". First published in French in 1965, the 1970 English translation is Guérin's best-known work, describing the intellectual substance and actual practice of anarchism. The English translation by Mary Klopper includes a foreword by Noam Chomsky, who describes it as an attempt "to extract from the history of libertarian thought a living, evolving tradition".

References

External links 
 Anarchism: From Theory to Practice via Libcom
 Anarchism: From Theory to Practice via Anarchist Library
 Anarchism: From Theory To Practice via Revolt Library

1965 non-fiction books
Books about anarchism
French non-fiction books